The following radio stations broadcast on FM frequency 100.6 MHz:

China 
 CNR Business Radio in Mianyang
 CNR China Traffic Radio in Hohhot
 CNR Music Radio in Xining
 The Voice of Jingjinji in Beijing

United Kingdom
Classic FM in London
BFBS Northern Ireland in Lisburn

References 

Lists of radio stations by frequency